thumb

Balete, officially the Municipality of Balete,  is a 5th class municipality in the province of Batangas, Philippines. According to the 2020 census, it has a population of 24,055 people. The people from Balete is called Baleteños.

Balete is well known for its location on Taal Lake, providing a panoramic view of the Taal Volcano. The pilgrimage site Marian Orchard is located in Barangay Malabanan.

Geography

According to the Philippine Statistics Authority, the municipality has a land area of  constituting  of the  total area of Batangas.

Barangays
Balete is politically subdivided into 13 barangays.

Climate

Demographics

In the 2020 census, Balete had a population of 24,055.

Economy

Gallery

References

External links

[ Philippine Standard Geographic Code]

Municipalities of Batangas
Populated places on Taal Lake